Scouten Brook is a tributary of Mehoopany Creek in Wyoming County, Pennsylvania, in the United States. The stream is designated as a High-Quality Coldwater Fishery and has wild trout. It is one of five large brooks to cut through South Mountain.

Course
Scouten Brook begins on South Mountain in Forkston Township. It flows north-northwest for several tenths of a mile before entering a valley and turning northwest for about a mile. The stream then receives an unnamed tributary from the right and turns west-northwest for several tenths of a mile. It then turns west for several tenths of a mile, leaving its valley, crossing Windy Valley Road, and reaching its confluence with Mehoopany Creek.

Geography and geology

Scouten Brook is one of five large brooks to divide a large, flat-topped mountain along Mehoopany Creek. This mountain is known as South Mountain and Scouten Brook is the furthest downstream of the five streams. Forkston Mountain is also situated near the stream. In the late 1800s, coal smut was reported at a tract at the headwaters of Scouten Brook.

Watershed and biology
The mouth of the stream is in the United States Geological Survey quadrangle of Dutch Mountain. However, its source is in the quadrangle of Noxen.

Wild trout naturally reproduce in Scouten Brook from its headwaters downstream to its mouth. The stream is classified as a High-Quality Coldwater Fishery.

History
Scouten Brook was entered into the Geographic Names Information System on August 2, 1979. Its identifier in the Geographic Names Information System is 1199963.

Since 2000, a streambank stabilization project has been done on Scouten Brook.

See also
White Brook, next tributary of Mehoopany Creek going downstream
Kasson Brook, next tributary of Mehoopany Creek going upstream
List of rivers of Pennsylvania

References

External links
Scouten Brook waterfalls

Tributaries of Mehoopany Creek